The Goito class was a group of four torpedo cruisers built for the Italian Regia Marina (Royal Navy) in the 1880s. They were among the first torpedo cruisers built for the Italian fleet, and were built to improve on the previous vessel, .

All four ships spent the majority of their time in service with the main Italian fleet, alternating between active duty for training exercises and reserve status. In 1897, Goito was converted into a minelayer and Montebello became a training ship for engine room personnel. Monzambano and Confienza were simply sold for scrap in 1901. Goito laid defensive minefields after Italy entered World War I in 1915, but otherwise did not see action during the war. The two surviving vessels remained in the Italian fleet until 1920, when they too were broken up for scrap.

Design
The first three members of the Goito class was designed by Engineering General Inspector Benedetto Brin, while  was designed by Engineering Director Giacinto Pullino. The four Goitos were similar to the preceding cruiser , the first torpedo cruiser Brin designed. As these were among the initial designs prepared by the Italian navy, they were experimental; Brin and Pullino used different hull shapes for all four vessels and fitted them with a variety of propulsion systems and armament.

General characteristics and machinery

As a result of their experimental nature, the ships of the Goito class varied slightly in size. The ships were built with steel hulls. They  had a crew of between 105 and 121.

The first three ships had similar propulsion systems that consisted of three steam engines, each driving a single screw propeller.  and  had double-expansion engines, while  had more advanced triple-expansion engines. Confienza instead used a two-shaft configuration for her double-expansion engines. Steam for the engines was supplied by coal-fired locomotive boilers; Goito and Montebello had six boilers, while Monzambano and Confienza had four. The boilers for Goito and Monzambano were trunked into two funnels, Montebello had three, and Confienza only had one.

In 1894, Goito had her center engine and screw removed and her original boilers replaced with oil-fired models. They were originally fitted with a fore-and-aft sailing rig to supplement the steam engines, though they were later removed.

Armament and armor

The primary armament for the Goito class was five  torpedo tubes, though Montebello only had four tubes. The ships also carried a variety of light guns. Goito was equipped with five  40-caliber (cal.) guns, two  20-cal. guns, and three 37 mm revolving Hotchkiss guns, all mounted singly. Montebello had six 57 mm guns and two 37 mm guns, and Monzambano carried only six 57 mm guns. Confienza was the only vessel to carry a medium-caliber gun, a single  32-cal. gun mounted on her bow. She also carried six 57 mm guns and two 37 mm guns.

Ships

Service history

All four Goito-class cruisers served with the main Italian fleet for the majority of their careers. This time was spent either laid up in the reserve component of the fleet, or activated for yearly training maneuvers. These frequently gamed a French attack on Italy, as in the case of the 1888 maneuvers—for which only Goito had been completed in time to participate—that simulated a French attack on La Spezia, or the 1893 maneuvers, which tested a French attack on Naples. In 1898, Monzambano and Montebello participated in a rare deployment for members of the class when they were assigned to the Levant Squadron that was tasked with patrolling the eastern Mediterranean Sea. Throughout this period, the ships of the class would either be distributed among the divisions of the fleet, as with the case of the annual training maneuvers, or stationed together while in reserve status; in 1895, for example, the four Goitos were assigned to the 2nd Maritime Department, along with Tripoli and the eight  torpedo cruisers.

In 1897, Goito was withdrawn from front-line service and converted in a minelayer, with a capacity for 60 naval mines in place of her torpedo tubes. Montebello remained on active duty until 1898, when she was converted into a training ship for engine room personnel, and was re-boilered with coal- and oil-fired equipment from several manufacturers in 1903. Confienza and Monzambano were the last members of the class to leave active service, being stricken from the naval register on the same day, 26 August 1901 and sold for scrapping. Goito continued to take part in fleet maneuvers as late as 1907 in her minelayer configuration, and both she and Manzambano remained in the Regia Marinas inventory during the Italo-Turkish War of 1911–1912 and World War I. Neither ship saw action in either conflict, though Goito laid defensive minefields in the Adriatic Sea after Italy entered World War I in 1915. Montebello was eventually stricken on 26 January 1920, and Goito followed her to the breakers' yard on 15 March.

Footnotes

Notes

Citations

References

External links
 Classe Goito Marina Militare website